This article contains the list of Indonesian endemic freshwater fishes. Indonesia is a country with vast amount of freshwater fish species; it is the country with the third-largest number of freshwater fish species in the world, with a total of 1155 species. And about 440 species are endemic to Indonesia. This makes Indonesia as the 4th country with the largest endemic freshwater fish species, with Brazil (1716 species) in the 1st place, China (888) in the 2nd place and USA (593 species) in the 3rd place. (Dody94 2011)

Below is the list of Indonesian endemic freshwater fishes:

References 
 Fishbase, edition of March, 2009, cited in: Dody94 (2011). Dody94's wordpress blog.  List of Indonesian endemic freshwater fishes. Accessed on: 1 August 2011.

.
Fish
Fish, endemic
Indonesia